Neocorus is a genus of beetles in the family Cerambycidae, found in South America and containing the following species:

 Neocorus diversipennis Belon, 1903
 Neocorus ibidionoides (Audinet-Serville, 1834)
 Neocorus zikani Melzer, 1920

References

Callidiopini